Mint Condition is an American R&B band from Minneapolis, Minnesota.  The band is focused on diverse genres such as jazz, hip hop, funk and dance. Mint Condition has also been nominated for one Grammy and 3 Soul Train Awards.  The group is credited with being one of the last major funk bands to chart before hip hop and new jack swing dominated black music in the 1990s.

History

Early years
Mint Condition was formed in the early 1980s. The band was originally made up of lead singer and (in-studio) drummer Stokley Williams, lead guitarist Homer O'Dell, and keyboardist Larry Waddell, Keyboardist/saxophonist Jeff Allen, keyboardist/percussionist/rhythm guitarist Keri Lewis, and bass guitarist Rick Kinchen. 
They were discovered by music producers Jimmy Jam and Terry Lewis in 1989, during a performance at the downtown Minneapolis nightclub First Avenue. Jam and Lewis signed Mint Condition to Perspective Records soon afterward.
Their debut album, Meant to Be Mint, was released on June 11, 1991 by Perspective. Afterward, they attempted to attract new jack swing listeners with their dance cut "Are You Free", which didn't see broad success with the song hitting #55 on the R&B charts. However, they did enjoy major success with the ballad "Breakin' My Heart (Pretty Brown Eyes)," which stayed on the charts for 34 weeks, reaching the R&B top 5 (#3), and the Pop Top 10 (#6) and was certified gold by the RIAA. Their third single, "Forever In Your Eyes", was also a successful Top 10 R&B hit (#7 R&B). 
Two years later, they released their second album, From The Mint Factory (1993). They enjoyed success with the single "U Send Me Swingin'" which peaked at #2 on Billboard's Hot R&B/Hip-Hop Songs Chart for four weeks straight in the spring of 1994. The song was also a hit on the Rhythmic Top 40 charts where it reached #14. The band's next two singles, "Someone to Love" and "So Fine", were Billboard Top 30 R&B hits, reaching the #28, and #29 spots respectively.

1996–2000
In September 1996, the band released Definition of a Band, which peaked in the R&B Top 15. The first successful single on this album was the Billboard R&B smash hit "What Kind of Man Would I Be?," about remaining faithful during a relationship (#2 R&B, #17 Pop). The single crept up to the number 2 spot on the Billboard R&B charts in a matter of weeks and was certified gold by the RIAA that December. "What Kind of Man Would I Be?" was so popular that it stayed on the Billboard R&B Charts for a total of 41 weeks before it finally fell off. "You Don't Have to Hurt No More", the second single released from Definition of a Band, was also a Top 10 R&B hit. (#10 R&B, #32 pop). The album received positive reviews and, together with the success of "What Kind of Man Would I Be?" and "You Don't Have to Hurt No More," helped Definition of a Band reach Gold status as well.

Two years later, the group released The Collection: 1991-1998, a compilation of greatest hits. After Perspective Records/A&M folded, the group signed with Elektra Records in 1999 and released their fourth full-length album, Life's Aquarium, which also debuted in the Top 10 (#7 R&B). Its main single, "If You Love Me", hit the R&B Top 5 and stayed on the R&B charts for 31 weeks.  The second single, "Is This Pain Our Pleasure", peaked at #42, while also peaking at #34 on the R&B Airplay Charts.

2000s: Livin' The Luxury Brown and E-Life
After a six-year hiatus, the group resurfaced as a quintet because Lewis left the group to produce for other artists, such as his ex-wife/singer Toni Braxton, and then joined the entertainment division at Santa Fe Station Casino.  In 2005, they released Livin' The Luxury Brown on their independent label Caged Bird Records. The album hit #1 on the Independent Album Charts and in 2006, the group released Live From The 9:30 Club, a performance of a concert at the 9:30 club in Washington DC.

In 2008, they released E-Life, which debuted at #8 on the Billboard R&B album chart, and spawned two singles, "Baby Boy, Baby Girl" and "Nothing Left To Say". The latter, became the band's first Top 30 R&B single in almost a decade (#27 R&B) as well as a Top 5 Billboard Urban Adult Contemporary hit, which peaked at #3.

2010–present: 7..., Tour with Prince, TV appearances

In December 2010, Mint Condition joined Prince and an ensemble cast of R&B and jazz musicians for his Welcome 2 America tour. On April 5, 2011, with the group's 20th anniversary approaching, Mint Condition celebrated with the release of their seventh studio album, titled 7.... It was produced by Shanachie Records and contained several hits, including "Caught My Eye" as well as their collaboration with Kelly Price, "Not My Daddy".
During the month of February, Mint Condition appeared as the house band for TV One's program Way Black When, which celebrated the greatest African American music artists throughout the '70s, 80's, and '90s.

In September 2012, the group released Music At The Speed Of Life. That December, Mint Condition was entered into the Soul Music Hall of Fame.

In 2013, they were featured on TV One's Unsung. On October 16, 2015, they released the Christmas CD Healing Season.

Discography

Studio
 Meant to Be Mint (1991)
 From the Mint Factory (1993)
 Definition of a Band (1996)
 Life's Aquarium (1999)
 Livin' the Luxury Brown (2005)
 E-Life (2008)
 7... (2011)
 Music at the Speed of Life (2012)

Christmas
 Healing Season (2015)

Awards and nominations

Grammy Awards
The Grammy Awards are awarded annually by the National Academy of Recording Arts and Sciences.

Soul Train Music Award

SoulTracks Readers' Choice Awards
Winners: Independent Album of the Year Mint Condition - Music @ the Speed of LIfe* (2013)
Winners: Duo or Group of the Year- Mint Condition* (2012)
Winners: Duo or Group of the Year- Mint Condition* (2011)
Winners: Album of the Year Mint Condition - e-Life* (2008)
Winners: Duo or Group of the Year - Mint Condition* (2008)

SoulMusic Hall Of Fame at SoulMusic.com
 Inducted: Contemporary Soul Music Artist/Group Or Duo* (December 2012)

References

External links
Website

African-American musical groups
American funk musical groups
American contemporary R&B musical groups
American soul musical groups
Musical groups established in 1984
Musical groups from Minnesota
Musical quintets
New jack swing music groups